eGuiders is a Hollywood-based website that aims to be the TV Guide for online video. Launched in February 2009, eGuiders features videos that are curated daily by Hollywood creators and executives such as Lost co-creator Damon Lindelof, comedian Jerry Stiller, and 24 executive producer Jon Cassar. The site's principal adviser is David Milch, the creator of NYPD Blue and Deadwood.

Background 

eGuiders sprung from a conversation between a new media producer, Marc Ostrick, and a Columbia University professor, Evangeline Morophos in response to growing clutter of online video. They had considered collaborating on a book on the evolution of online video, but opted to gather a group of friends and colleagues to directly help people cut through the clutter. Hollywood professionals currently participating with eGuiders include:

 Mark Tinker: Executive Producer of Private Practice
 Damon Lindelof: Co-creator of Lost
 Jerry Stiller: Comedian (Frank Costanza on Seinfeld)
 Shawn Ryan: Executive Producer of The Shield
 John Landis: Director of Animal House and The Blues Brothers
 David Milch: Creator of NYPD Blue and Deadwood
 Willie Garson: Actor (Standford on Sex and the City)
 Brady Brim-DeForest: Co-founder of Tubefilter
 Tim Street: Creator of French Maid TV
 Daisy Whitney: New media journalist and critic
 Zack Whedon: Co-Writer of Dr. Horrible's Sing-Along Blog

See also
OVGuide
NewTeeVee
Tubefilter

References

External links
 , Entertainment Weekly

Online magazines published in the United States
Magazines established in 2009